Santa Cruz, officially the Municipality of Santa Cruz,  is a 1st class municipality in the province of Zambales, Philippines. According to the 2020 census, it has a population of 63,839 people.

Geography

Barangays

Santa Cruz is politically subdivided into 25 barangays.

Climate

Demographics

Economy 

Banking and Financial sector is well developed in this town. Several banks such as Philippine National Bank - Norther Zambales branch, Bank of Commerce, BDO Network Bank, and some rural banks are in place as well as remittance centers like Palawan Pawnshop, Cebuana Luillher, Western Union and LBC Express including other local pawnshops.

There is also a vibrant merchandising and trade in town. 7/11 convenient store is now serving likewisd a local department store, the Magic Mall and known pharmaceutical shops like Mercury Drug, Watson Pharmacy and St. Joseph Pharmacy.

Two cinema houses were previously serving the locals but due to high availability of recording media and online movies can now readily watched, the cinema houses eventually closed.

Cable Television service, Telephone network and recently the Converge IT joined the internetworking services for the local aside from the vast network signal of the mobile services.

Education

The town has both public and private schools, including those run by religious organizations, foundations and individuals. The President Ramon Magsaysay State University (PRMSU), formerly Ramon Magsaysay Technological University (RMTU) - Santa Cruz Campus is part of the PRMSU System operating in the whole Zambales Province, offering undergraduate and graduate degrees in Educational Teaching and other courses. Columban College - Santa Cruz campus is part of the Columban College System controlled by the Roman Catholic Diocese of Iba, headed by the Bishop of Diocese of Iba. Micro Asia College of Science and Technology - Santa Cruz campus. Santa Cruz Academy is a parochial secondary school operated and controlled by St. Michael the Archangel Parish of Santa Cruz.  The Santa Cruz High School is operated by the local government and there are Lipay High School, Santa Cruz South High School, Don Marcelo Marty High School, San Fernando High School, Acoje Mines High School, Mena Memorial Higj School and Guisguis National High School. St. Michael School is a private school that caters Preparatory, Elementary, and High School Education. Children of Zion Montessori School inc. is a private school that caters preparatory up to elementary. Santa Cruz has profound primary education where in every baranggay has its own elementary schools and some with high school departments established.

References

External links

[ Philippine Standard Geographic Code]
Philippine Census Information

Municipalities of Zambales
1612 establishments in New Spain